In mathematical optimization theory, the mixed linear complementarity problem, often abbreviated as MLCP or LMCP, is a generalization of the linear complementarity problem to include free variables.

References 
 Complementarity problems
 Algorithms for complementarity problems and generalized equations
 An Algorithm for the Approximate and Fast Solution of Linear Complementarity Problems

Linear algebra
Mathematical optimization